Vatanım Sensin (alternatively known as Wounded Love in English) is a Turkish television drama set during the last years of Ottoman Empire and the Turkish War of Independence. The main character "Cevdet" is based on the life of Mustafa Mümin Aksoy, whose nickname was "Gavur Mümin". The first episode aired on October 26, 2016 on Kanal D. It stars Halit Ergenç and Bergüzar Korel.

The series begins with the Balkan Wars, after World War One and the death of Hasan Tahsin, who was the first to open fire on the Greek soldiers that landed at Izmir on May 15, 1919. The first season finished with the foundation of the Grand National Assembly of Turkey on April 23, 1920.

The second season begins with the Treaty of Sèvres on August 10, 1920. The series finished with Liberation of İzmir by Turkish army on September 9, 1922.

Plot 
Mira lay Cevdet, a major who served in Thessaloniki of the Ottoman Army towards the end of the Balkan War is a patriotic soldier. He is a passionate lover to his wife Azize, and a compassionate father to his children Ali Kemal, Yıldız and Hilal, and a good son to his mother, Hasibe Hanım. While in the army, he and his close friend Miralay Tevfik were resisting with all his might to not lose his homeland at the front, an event that happened to him will open a new page in his life, he will be forced to break away from the Cevdet family, and he will be forced to break away from the  Thessaloniki Province. Tevfik will help Azize, who had to immigrate from Thessaloniki to Izmir. He is with them at the expense of revealing his hidden feelings towards Azize. However, Tevfik also has a big secret.

Azize, on the other hand, will find herself in a difficult struggle with her husband, three children and mother-in-law. After the incident that happened to his wife, whom he loved dearly, the Ankara Government will raise his children by struggling with the absence of Cevdet, who went to the Greek side as an agent in favour of Mustafa Kemal and his friends, and the difficulties of the war years. Yıldız is a beautiful girl with high eyes and Hilal is a patriotic and combative young girl.

Cast 
Halit Ergenç as Cevdet
He killed İlyas Sergeant in order to get among the Greeks in the prisoner camp. His task is to find weapons to resist. After Tevfik's betrayal, Ivan was killed. The heavy traumas he has experienced have always been and will be trouble for him. When Yakup found him, he started working for Mustafa Kemal. He has been betrayed by his best friend and many others. When he started working with Mustafa Kemal, he divorced his wife. Now everything will be more complicated than anything in the past. In Chapter 15, he was dismissed and told to be sent to a prison camp. In the 16th episode, he escaped from the prison with the help of Yakup and brought Eşref to the Greeks. He kidnapped Azize to get Yakup treated. He has to execute Eşref Pasha in order to be reinstated. However, with a clever plan, he manages to save Eşref Pasha's life.

Bergüzar Korel as Azize
She is quite patriotic. She is upset about Cevdet's duty in the Greek army. The biggest pain she has suffered is divorce. Her daughter Hilal was saved at the last moment when she was about to be hanged by the Greeks. She has married Tevfik, whom she believes will protect her and her children.

Miray Daner as Hilal
She tries to awaken the public with her writings under the pseudonym Halit Iqbal. She even took the risk of being hanged for the country. She lowered a big flag while the Greeks were saluting and disgraced them. She is in love with Leon, but treats him harshly because he is an enemy soldier. She shot Leon to save Ali Kemal in episode 19, and apologized to him in episode 20.

Boran Kuzum as Leon
He takes pity on the Turks and is in love with Hilal. He was kidnapped by Eşref with Cevdet's plan. Hilal brought him food while he was in prison. He danced with Hilal at the ball. In the 17th episode, he confessed his love to Hilal and Hilal responded by slapping him even though she loved him. He was shot by Hilal in the 19th episode, but he didn't die. His mother thought that a love letter he wrote for Hilal was for Yıldız, and wanted him to marry Yıldız. "There will be no marriage like this," Leon said during the engagement reception. He refused to marry Yıldız. He writes under the pen name Andreas Akis.

Pınar Deniz as Yıldız
She liked Leon. She is very disappointed when Leon tells her that he doesn't love her. She was married to Chief Physician Mustafa Sami and they were going to go to Anatolia, but Yıldız, who did not want this, told Vasili which way to go to Anatolia and caused Chief Physician Mustafa Sami to be ambushed. In fact, she is in love with her adopted brother Ali Kemal. She was disgraced by Leon at their engagement reception and was quite devastated.

Emre Şen as Hacimihalis
He has a tavern. Eftelya and journalists work there.

Yasemin Szawlowski as Eleni
She is the daughter of Azize's neighbor in Izmir. She is also in love with Ali Kemal. She is the only person who knows that Ali Kemal is in love with Yıldız.

Alina Boz as Peranses Anastasia Romanova
Eleni's relative and Azize's neighbor. He loves Azize very much. Despite being Greek, he treats Turks well.

Celile Toyon as Hasibe
She is mother of Cevdet. In the 15th episode, she disowned Cevdet. Later she learned that Cevdet was not a traitor and died of natural causes.

Onur Saylak  as Tevfik
He is a traitor trying to sell weapons to Ivan, who betrayed his blood brother, Cevdet. He collaborates with the English Spy William Charles Hamilton. He is the murderer of Eşref Pasha. In the years that passed after the betrayal, he was promoted to the ranks of Miralay (colonel) and Mirliva (general). He was killed by Cevdet.

Deniz Ayaz as distributor boy
He is the child who distributes the Amasya Circular and Halit İkbal's writings. He raised the Turkish Flag when he saw it on the ground. While the Greeks were going to arrest him because of the articles he distributed, Azize prevented this situation. In Episode 15, he carried the Turkish Flag and said, "Izmir is ours." When Azize and Cevdet died, he put the Turkish flag on their graves and saluted.

Senan Kara as Veronica
A fortune teller told her that her son was alive, but she thought it was not real. She goes to Athens with her sons. He was not seen again.

Kubilay Aka as Ali Kemal/Dimitri
Son of Cevdet. But later he learns that he is not actually the child of Cevdet and Azize. Cevdet found him after a war and adopted him. He is in love with his adoptive sister Yıldız. He goes to Athens with his real mother, Veronika, and his brother, Leon. He was not seen again.

Cihan Çulfa as Dimitri
It is a Greek soldier waiting at Cevdet's door. He is responsible for fulfilling Cevdet's orders.

Baki Davrak as Vasili
Eşref burned their village and his eldest child remained in the fire. He is dismissed in the 15th Division and continues to serve as a colonel in the 16th. He was executed by shooting in the season finale.

Murat Mastan as İhsan
He is an Ottoman soldier with a mustache waiting at Tevfik's door. He can never understand Tevfik's ideas.

Can Kolukısa as Christo
Eftelya's father. He cut his own tongue on Tevfik's orders. Currently, he is staying in the tavern of Hacımihalis. He was stabbed to death by William Charles Hamilton.

Şebnem Hassanisoughi as Eftelya
She is a Romanian singer. She is in love with Tevfik. She doesn't give up on him, even if she realizes that he's cheating on her. While Tevfik was going to kill her, she jumped off a cliff but did not die. She is one of the few people who know and live with the truth. She was strangled to death by William Charles Hamilton.

Hakan Salınmış as Eşref
He is one of the leaders in the Anatolian resistance movement . He allowed Cevdet to infiltrate the Greeks. He is trying to pass the secret weapons to Anatolia. He has a personality that does not think much about the future and does not like to take orders from anyone. Even from Mustafa Kemal. When he did not give the weapons to Mustafa Kemal and showed himself as a hero, he started to be defined as a bad character. Cevdet took him to Greece and was forced to execute him. But with his plan, he ensured the survival of Eşref Pasha. Eşref Pasha later decided to join Mustafa Kemal. While fighting with the Greeks, Miralay was betrayed by Tevfik and was shot dead. In the 21st episode, his body was circulated in Izmir. Tevfik received the document that Cevdet said was a patriot, but Captain Yakup corrected this situation.

Tolga Coskun as Haydar
He is a patriotic journalist. Hilal helps him and his friends. He published many inscriptions. While raising the flag from the ground in Episode 15, he is shot in the heart by Stavro and dies on the spot.

Ahmet Tansu Taşanlar as Hasan
He fired the first bullet of the resistance against the Greek Army in occupied Izmir and was killed with two bullets by the Greek Lieutenant Leon. He played Hasan Tahsin, who fired the first bullet of the struggle in real life. In the series, he is also a very close friend of Hilal, whom he loves very much.

Yiğit Çelebi as Chief Physician Mustafa Sami
Mustafa Sami, chief physician at Izmir Military Hospital, is Eşref Pasha's nephew. He is in love with Yıldız and they got married. However, when Yıldız turns out to be a Kuvacı, he is sought by the Greek Soldiers. While he was going to go from İzmir to Anatolia with Yıldız, an ambush was set up by the Greek Colonel and he was shot in the heart and died on the spot.

Mert Aydin as Sergeant İlyas
He is the sergeant who communicated with Eşref in the prisoner camp. He told Cevdet that his family was alive and asked Cevdet, "Will you be a traitor for the homeland? When Cevdet said yes, he sacrificed himself and made Cevdet's trust gained by the Greeks, and he asked Cevdet to do this: "There is no victory without casualties," he explained.

Genco Özak as Mehmet
He is the brother of Hasan Tahsin. He has sworn to continue his brother's cause. In the flag scene, he pulls the flag. He becomes a martyr by detonating the warehouse where the Greek soldiers are located.

Turgut Tunçalp as Hasan
Ölmez Hasan, who was a bandit to the Ottomans in the mountains, was shot by a Greek Colonel and poisoned by the chief physician of the hospital, Mustafa Sami.

Emrah Ersoy as Andreas
He is in Marco's team and raped girls. He later helped Hilal. He was killed by Mehmet while fleeing from Izmir.

Ozcan Yigit as Marco
He is the Greek captain who raped Azize. Cevdet killed him.

Defne Yalnız as a fortune teller
She is a famous fortune teller. It is known that what she says is usually true. She told Hasibe that her son was hiding something. She told Veronika that both of her sons were alive. Sh was not seen again after that.

Tugrul Tülek as Stavro
He is the special colonel who came to investigate Ölmez Hasan by order of Vasilli. He remained there afterward. The torturer who killed Ölmez Hasan's son, Haydar and Mustafa Sami is also the officer who thinks Cevdet is a traitor. He was killed by Azize.

Emre Baser as Gürcü Salih
He is the soldier of Mustafa Kemal. He disguised as Ivan in order to deceive Tevfik. Eşref Pasha cut his way to get the weapons. When Eşref told Mustafa Kemal that no weapons would be sent, the conflict started and just as he was about to kill Eşref, Tevfik shot him in the back.

Selma Ergeç as Halide Edip
He came to Izmir and organized speeches. They are with Mustafa Kemal. When his mission is completed, he returns to Istanbul.

Serkan Kunter as Ivan
The real Ivan. He told Cevdet the truth. Cevdet killed him because he knew too much.

Ayberk Aladar as Imam Effendi
He is the imam of the village. Mustafa had married Sami and Yıldız. In the lynching attempt on Yıldız, he made her escape.

Fatih Artman as Jacob
He is the soldier of Mustafa Kemal. He came to Izmir after the death of Salih and thus became one of the targets of the Greeks. He is called "Thousand and One Faces" or "Faceless" because he disguises so well. Until now, he was drunk, disguised as a Greek soldier. He took Hilal in the flag scene without showing it to anyone. At the ball, he had the Erzurum Congress recorded. He was shot while breaking Cevdet out of prison, but he did not die.

Arda Kaptanlar as Yavuz
He is Eşref's right hand man. After her death, he learned that Cevdet was not a traitor and gave Azize a compass, but Tevfik found the compass. He was stabbed to death by Tevfik in the warehouse.

Serhat Tutumluer as Deputy Prime Minister Costas
He is the deputy prime minister of Greece. He dismisses Vasilli and Cevdet by order of the Prime Minister. At the same time, Bayrak sees the disgrace in the scene and sends Cevdet into exile. He replaces Vasilli at 16. At the same time, at the end of the episode, Cevdet was very surprised when he brought Eşref to him.

Okan Yalabik as William Charles Hamilton
He is a British agent for the British Government. He came to Izmir to report what the Greeks had done and engaged in many bloody activities. After the death of Lucy, the only person he loves in the world, he will start working for the Turks. He is killed by Cevdet.

Levent Can as General Filipos
The biggest dream of Lieutenant General Filipos, who is Veronika's older brother, Leon's uncle and Aleksi's father; To go down in history as the Greek General who captured Ankara. After the execution of General Vasili, he was appointed as the new high commissioner of Izmir. Lieutenant General Filipos, who is ruthless, cruel, ruthless and pro-war, always underestimates the Turks. In the 56th episode, he killed Havva, the Turkish maid of his house, whom he was interested in and liked, on the grounds that she was helping the Turkish army. Filipos, who from time to time was suspicious of Cevdet's actions and thought that he was a traitor in the Greek army, then realized that Cevdet was wrong in this thought with his sharp intelligence and started to trust Cevdet again. Cevdet deliberately revealed himself to Filipos in section 58 as per the plan, thrown into the cell. In the final episode, which is the 59th episode, Cevdet, together with Leon, misled Filipos again and gave the necessary time and support to the Turkish Army. After the great defeat of the Greek army, Filipos was informed at the military court that he would be dismissed from his duties, that he would be stripped of his ranks and that the king of Greece asked him not to return to Athens. Upon this, he committed suicide by shooting himself in the head by placing the bullet in the letter Cevdet sent to his room before he died, in order to commit suicide. last word It was reported that they would be stripped of their ranks and that the King of Greece wanted him not to return to Athens. Upon this, he committed suicide by shooting himself in the head by placing the bullet in the letter Cevdet sent to his room before he died, in order to commit suicide. last word It was reported that they would be stripped of their ranks and that the King of Greece wanted him not to return to Athens. Upon this, he committed suicide by shooting himself in the head by placing the bullet in the letter Cevdet sent to his room before he died, in order to commit suicide. last wordIt has been over.

Berker Guven as Alexia
He is the cousin of First Lieutenant Leon, son of General Filipos. Even though he tried various things to get his father's attention, he could not get his attention. He suspects his cousin Leon is a traitor. When Leon went to his house to arrest him, the soldiers next to him were shot and killed by Jacob. He was then shot and killed by both Captain Jacob and his cousin Leon.

Ahmet Saracoglu as Ismet Pasha
He is the Commander of the Western Front of the Turkish Army . He has victories in the First Battle of İnönü and the Second Battle of İnönü. He conveys the orders of Mustafa Kemal Pasha to Cevdet.

Ufuk Bayraktar as Dağıstanlı
He is one of the most powerful efes of İzmir. Even though the farm and its office were handled by Tevfik for a while, he became the most powerful efe again as before. He is bold and strong enough to capture İsmet Pasha and assassinate Mustafa Kemal. Although he is offered to join the regular army, he does not accept the rank of Major offered to him because he belittles him. He was stabbed to death during an argument with Cevdet.

Şükran Ovalı as Seher
She is a woman who can do anything for a Dagestan national. She is in love with Dagestan. She doesn't like Azize at all and she gets jealous. Dagestani opposed Dagestani to prevent him from assassinating Mustafa Kemal. However, Dagestanli, who was blinded, killed Seher.

Fatih Artman as Yakup
A turkey captain and assistant of Cevdet.

Production

Filming
Filming began in August 2016 on location in Istanbul, Izmir and the Aegean Region. Additionally, a set was built in Istanbul to recreate the coastal promenade of Izmir and the neighborhoods of the time. The filming of the first chapter lasted between 35 and 40 days.

International Broadcasts
  - The series premiered on Kanal D on September 13, 2017, under the title Patria mea ești tu!
  - The series premiered on Pink BH in 2017 and on Federalna TV in 2020 as Ti si moja domovina
  - The series premiered on Sitel in November 2018 under the title Далеку од Дома (Daleku od doma; Far away from home)
  - The series premiered on Deepto TV in December 2019 under the title জননী জন্মভূমি (Jononi jonmobhumi; Mother-motherland).
  - The series premiered on Kanal D Drama in July 2020 under the title Dashuri e plagosur (Wounded love)

  - The series is set to release on Dot Republic Media Network on YouTube in Urdu language and GEO KAHANI channel with the title آتش عشق (Fire of Love).

References

External links 
 
 Official webpage
Official YouTube Channel

2016 Turkish television series debuts
2018 Turkish television series endings
Television series produced in Istanbul
Television shows set in Istanbul
Turkish drama television series
Kanal D original programming
Golden Butterfly Award winners
Turkish War of Independence films